Calamotropha yamanakai is a moth in the family Crambidae. It was described by Inoue in 1958. It is found in Japan.

Subspecies
Calamotropha yamanakai yamanakai
Calamotropha yamanakai owadai Inoue, 1982

References

Crambinae
Moths described in 1958